The Walkway Marathon is an annual marathon held in June in Poughkeepsie, New York and surrounding areas of the Hudson Valley.

The first event, run on June 13, 2015, featured full and half marathons and a 5K run, attracting a total of nearly 2,500 participants (and another 2,500 visitors watching them), including 283 runners in the full marathon. The routes started at Marist College and included the Walkway Over the Hudson State Historic Park, which the runners traversed in both directions, as well as some adjacent segments of rail trails in Dutchess and Ulster Counties.

The second run was held June 11-12, 2016, and the third on June 10-11, 2017.

List of winners

Marathon

Half marathon

5K race

See also
List of marathon races in North America

References

External links
 Official site
 Video about 2015 marathon at Hudson Valley News Network
 Chronotrack race results 2015
 Chronotrack race results 2016

Marathons in the United States
Recurring sporting events established in 2015
2015 establishments in New York (state)
Poughkeepsie, New York